The 1930 Penn Quakers football team was an American football team that represented the University of Pennsylvania as an independent during the 1930 college football season. In their first and only season under head coach Lud Wray, the Quakers compiled a 5–4 record and outscored their opponents 225 to 145. The team played its home games at Franklin Field in Philadelphia.

Near-sighted guard Frank Yablonski wore a customized helmet which included optical lenses.

Schedule

References

Penn
Penn Quakers football seasons
Penn Quakers football